Agathotoma merlini is a species of sea snail, a marine gastropod mollusk in the family Mangeliidae. First described in 1910, its species name refers to Martial Henri Merlin, governor-general of French Congo. It occurs on the coast of Africa, and also on the islands of São Tomé and Príncipe.

Description
The size of the shell varies between 5 mm and 8.5 mm; its diameter 3 mm.

The solid shell is very elongated and has a fusiform-subcylindrical shape. The spire contains 8 whorls; the first ones smooth and convex, the others slightly convex. The suture is appressed. The sculpture consists of longitudinal ribs, narrower than their intervals, 10 on the body whorl, and with excessively fine striae, visible only with the aid of a lens. The aperture is narrow, measuring less than half the total length of the shell. The columella is a little excavated at the top, slightly twisted at the base. The outer lip is smooth on the inner side, with a sinus on top and inflected below the sinus. The color of the shell is white with deciduous yellowish areas. The last three whorls  show a brown subsutural zone, interrupted by the lower extremities of the ribs, which remain white. The columella is tinged with a dark brown color.

References

External links
  Tucker, J.K. 2004 Catalog of recent and fossil turrids (Mollusca: Gastropoda). Zootaxa 682:1-1295.
 
 MNHN, Paris: syntype

merlini
Invertebrates of São Tomé and Príncipe
Gastropods described in 1910
Invertebrates of Africa